The Grey Highlands Hawks were a United Hockey Union-sanctioned junior ice hockey team from Markdale, Ontario, Canada.  They were a member of the Canadian Premier Junior Hockey League and began play in the 2016–17 season.

History
In 2016, a two-year agreement was reached between Grey Highlands and Hawks owners Carrie Robertson and Cory Lafonte. The team played their first season in 2016–17 and won the first round playoff series over the Glengarry Highlanders. They were eliminated in the round-robin, losing to all three other teams. The following season, the Brampton Royals, a 2017 expansion team, was merged into the Hawks roster a week before the start of the season.

After three seasons, the Hawks were removed from the league in the first week of the 2019–20 season.

Season-by-season records

References

External links
Hawks website

Junior ice hockey teams in Canada
Ice hockey teams in Ontario
2016 establishments in Ontario
Ice hockey clubs established in 2016
Grey County